5.11 Tactical (pronounced "five eleven tactical") is an American apparel brand of outdoor clothing, footwear, uniforms and tactical equipment, primarily targeting the market of military, law enforcement and public safety personnel. The company is based in Irvine, California, and also operates a chain of retail stores, with 96 locations as of July, 2022.

History 
5.11 started in Modesto, California as a clothing line created by rock climber Royal Robbins. Upon reaching the top of a climb in Yosemite National Park, Robbins noticed that the pants he was wearing were not suited for climbing and decided that he needed to design something more durable and with better functionality. Robbins and his wife Liz owned a boot and clothing company, Royal Robbins LLC, and began manufacturing specialty pants by the name of "5.11" in 1968, which had a trademarked strap-and-slash pocket design.

The name "5.11" comes from the highest rock climbing difficulty level that was listed in the Yosemite Decimal System, which was developed by Robbins in the 1950s. The difficulty level is somewhat jokingly defined as, "after thorough inspection, you conclude this move is obviously impossible; however, occasionally someone actually accomplishes it".

Robbins sold a 51% stake in his company to Dan Costa in 1999, who, after much streamlining, noticed that the 5.11 pants were becoming popular at the FBI Academy in Quantico, Virginia. Costa bought the entire company in 2002 and ended up selling Royal Robbins Clothing back to Robbins in 2003, but kept the 5.11 brand and spun off a whole new company called 511 Inc. or 5.11 Tactical. Partnering with the FBI, Dan Costa and his co-partner Francisco Morales began creating additional tactical apparel and improving on the existing product line.

In 2006, 5.11 Tactical was ranked #211 on Inc. magazine's list of the 500 fastest-growing companies in the nation. In 2007, TA Associates, a Boston private equity firm, bought a majority stake in 5.11 Tactical for $305 million.

In 2012, 5.11 Tactical purchased Seattle-based custom outdoor apparel brand, Beyond Clothing LLC, for an undisclosed amount. An April Fools' joke that same year resulted in the production of the Tactical Duty contemporary kilt. Also in 2012, the company announced it was moving development jobs to Irvine, California, while leaving some functions in Modesto.

In 2014, the company expanded into retail and opened pilot locations in Riverside and Las Vegas, and the following two years it opened stores in California, Colorado, Texas, Florida, Utah and Australia.

In 2016, the company was acquired by Compass Diversified Holdings for US$401 million.

Retail stores 
As of September 2020, 5.11 Tactical operates a chain of 82 retail stores across 27 states in the United States, as well as overseas branches in Germany, Australia, Mexico, Bahrain, Mainland China, Taiwan, Indonesia, Ireland, Japan, and Philippines. Additionally, the flagship store was established to Finland in August 2020.  In 2021, they have continued their announced plan to open new stores with multiple locations under development.

In popular culture 
5.11 Tactical makes clothing, gloves, boots, holsters, knives, flashlights, slings, and packs for law enforcement use, but is popular with civilian shooters and private military contractors.

Actress Jennifer Garner and her co-stars wore 5.11 watches in the 2007 film The Kingdom.

5.11 is the official plate carrier of the CrossFit Games.. 

5.11 products are featured in various Ubisoft video games including Tom Clancy's Ghost Recon Wildlands, Far Cry 5, Tom Clancy's The Division 2, and Tom Clancy's Ghost Recon Breakpoint.

In the episode "The Truth Has a Ring to It" from the second season of the HBO series Barry, Monroe Fuches (portrayed by Stephen Root) is seen wearing a 5.11 backpack.

References 

Clothing brands of the United States
United States military uniforms
Law enforcement uniforms
Clothing companies established in 1992
1992 establishments in California
American companies established in 1992